Yellow Pine (also Yellowpine) is an unincorporated community in Webster Parish, Louisiana, United States.

Yellow Pine was also the name of a sawmill camp near Many, Sabine Parish, which was the birthplace (in 1902) of U.S. Representative Ed Gossett.

Notes

Unincorporated communities in Webster Parish, Louisiana
Unincorporated communities in Louisiana